Synophis bogerti, known commonly as Bogert's fishing snake or Bogert's shadow snake, is a species of snake in the family Colubridae. The species is endemic to northwestern South America.

Etymology
The specific name, bogerti, is in honor of American herpetologist Charles Mitchill Bogert.

Geographic range
S. bogerti is found in Napo Province, Ecuador.

References

Further reading
Torres-Carvajal, Omar; Echevarría, Lourdes; Venegas, Pablo Javier; Chávez, Germán; Camper, Jeffrey (2015). "Description and phylogeny of three new species of Synophis (Colubridae, Dipsadinae) from the tropical Andes in Ecuador and Peru". ZooKeys 546: 153–179. (Synophis bogerti, new species). (in English with an abstract in Spanish).

Colubrids
Snakes of South America
Reptiles of Ecuador
Endemic fauna of Ecuador
Reptiles described in 2015